The Differential Doppler effect occurs when light is emitted from a rotating source.  

In circumstellar environments it describes the difference in photons arriving at orbiting dust particles. Photons that originate from the limb that is rotating away from the particle are red-shifted, while photons emitted from the limb rotating toward the particle are blue-shifted.

See also
 Yarkovsky effect
 Poynting–Robertson effect
 Radiation pressure
 Doppler effect

References 

Doppler effects
Astrophysics